Sir William Charters Patey, KCMG (born 11 July 1953) is a British retired diplomat. He was British Ambassador to Afghanistan from 2010 to 2012, and previously served as Ambassador to Sudan, to Iraq and to Saudi Arabia.

He retired from HM Diplomatic Service in April 2012 and was replaced by Sir Richard Stagg, formerly British High Commissioner to India. He has since worked in business.

Early life
Patey attended Trinity Academy, Edinburgh, Scotland until 1971. He earned a Master of Arts (MA) from the University of Dundee in Dundee, Scotland.

Career
Patey joined the FCO in 1975. He went to the Middle East Centre for Arabic Studies (MECAS) from 1977-8. From 2005-6 he was the Ambassador to Iraq and from 2002-5 the Ambassador to Sudan. Patey gave evidence to The Iraq Inquiry on 24 November 2009 and 5 January 2010.
From May 2010 to April 2012, Patey was the British Ambassador to Afghanistan.

He joined the consultancy Control Risks as Government and International Relations Adviser in July 2012 and became a Executive Director of HSBC Bank Middle East on 10 July 2012. Justifying British support for, and arms sales to, serial human rights violators in the Middle East in November 2012—that is, even in the face of the Arab Spring—Patey said, "The people in the Gulf will say, 'you of all people should understand why evolutionary change is better than revolutionary change'," referring to European revolutions.

He was appointed Chairman of Swindon Town F.C. on 15 October 2012.

Patey is a Governor and Distinguished Fellow of New Westminster College in New Westminster, British Columbia, Canada . He is a patron of the charity Kids for Kids, helping children in rural areas of Darfur, Sudan.

Recognition
Already a Companion of the Order of St Michael and St George (CMG), Patey was appointed Knight Commander of the Order of St Michael and St George (KCMG) in the 2009 New Year Honours List.

Personal life
He married Vanessa Morrell in 1978. They have two sons, William Rory and Thomas. Patey is an avid cinema goer.

References

1953 births
Living people
Diplomats from Edinburgh
Alumni of the University of Dundee
Ambassadors of the United Kingdom to Afghanistan
Ambassadors of the United Kingdom to Iraq
Ambassadors of the United Kingdom to Sudan
Ambassadors of the United Kingdom to Saudi Arabia
Knights Commander of the Order of St Michael and St George
People educated at Trinity Academy, Edinburgh
Swindon Town F.C. directors and chairmen